A special election to the United States House of Representatives for Iowa's 1st congressional district was held September 24, 1850.

The winning candidate would serve briefly in the United States House of Representatives to represent Iowa in the 31st Congress until the General election on October 8, 1850.

Background 
In 1848, the Whig Party nominated Miller to run against incumbent Democratic Congressman William Thompson. Thompson was declared the winner by the state's election canvassers, but Miller accused Thompson of absconding with the voting rolls from the election. The U.S. House resolved the contest over two years after it occurred, by deciding that neither Thompson nor Miller was entitled to the seat.

Candidates

Democratic

Nominee 

 William Thompson, former U.S. Representative from Iowa's 1st congressional district (1847-1850)

Whig

Nominee 

 Daniel F. Miller, lawyer and former member of Iowa's territorial house of representatives (1840)

Independent

Nominee 

Delazon Smith, anti-abolitionist activist who later went onto become a U.S. Senator from Oregon

General election

See also 
 United States House of Representatives elections, 1844
 United States House of Representatives elections, 1846

References 

Iowa 1850 01
Iowa 1850 01
1850 01 Special
Iowa 01 Special
United States House of Representatives 01 Special
United States House of Representatives 1850 01